Ralph Leighton (born 1949) is an American biographer, film producer, and friend of the late physicist Richard Feynman. He recorded Feynman relating stories of his life. Leighton has released some of the recordings as The Feynman Tapes. These interviews (available as The Feynman Tapes on audio) became the basis for the books Surely You're Joking, Mr. Feynman! and What Do You Care What Other People Think?, which were later combined into the hardcover anniversary edition Classic Feynman: All the Adventures of a Curious Character. Leighton is an amateur drummer and founder of the group Friends of Tuva. In 1990 he wrote Tuva or Bust! Richard Feynman's Last Journey.

He is credited as associate producer and originator of the concept for the Academy-Award–nominated documentary film Genghis Blues (2000), which came about through the nexus provided by Friends of Tuva.

He is the son of the late Caltech physicist Robert B. Leighton, who was also a close friend of Feynman. He is married to Phoebe Kwan; they have two children, Nicole and Ian.

External links
 
 
 
 Feynman's Tips on Physics by Richard P. Feynman, Michael A. Gottlieb, Ralph Leighton
 Tuva or Bust! A Review by Bobby Matherne
 Friends of Tuva
 Review of the movie Genghis Blues
 The Feynman Tapes

1949 births
American biographers
Ghostwriters
Living people
Richard Feynman
Place of birth missing (living people)